Lap Shun Hui (born 1955), also known as John Hui, is a Chinese American tech entrepreneur. He is the co-founder of PC manufacturing companies Everex and eMachines. He is also the current owner of LCD manufacturer InFocus and the former owner of PC manufacturer Packard Bell.

Biography

Hui was born in Guangdong Province in southern China, and was raised in Hong Kong since he was one year old. He moved to the United States in 1973 to attend college at University at Buffalo, and later received his MBA from McMaster University in Canada.

Hui's first involvement in the tech industry began when he helped found computer manufacturer Everex in 1983. Several years later, in 1995, Hui has been president of the monitor manufacturer Korea Data Systems USA, Inc., which he used to help form tech start-up eMachines in 1998. In 2004, Hui sold eMachines to computer hardware giant Gateway, Inc. for $266 million in cash and stock. In the process, he became Gateway's second-largest shareholder. In 2006, after becoming dissatisfied with Gateway's leadership, he offered to purchase the firm for $450 million but was rebuffed. That same year, Hui purchased Packard Bell, later selling it to Acer in 2008. He then purchased Oregon-based LCD manufacturer InFocus in 2009.

Hui and his wife Pauline Wong, a former Hong Kong film actress, have one son and reside in Bradbury, California.

References

External links
 - John Hui's website

Living people
1955 births
University at Buffalo alumni
McMaster University alumni
Hong Kong emigrants to the United States
Businesspeople from Guangdong
People from Bradbury, California